Tracy S. Letts (born July 4, 1965) is an American actor, playwright, and screenwriter. He started his career at the Steppenwolf Theatre before making his Broadway debut as a playwright for August: Osage County (2007), for which he received the Pulitzer Prize for Drama and the Tony Award for Best Play. As an actor he won the Tony Award for Best Actor in a Play for the Broadway revival of Who's Afraid of Virginia Woolf? (2013).

As a playwright, Letts is known for having written for the Steppenwolf Theatre, Off-Broadway and Broadway theatre. His works include: Killer Joe, Bug, Man from Nebraska, August: Osage County, Superior Donuts, Linda Vista, and The Minutes. Letts adapted three of his plays into films, Bug and Killer Joe, both directed by William Friedkin, and August: Osage County, directed by John Wells. His 2009 play Superior Donuts was adapted into a television series of the same name. As a stage actor, Letts has performed in various classic plays with the Steppenwolf Theatre since 1988. He made his acting Broadway debut as George in the revival of Edward Albee's play Who's Afraid of Virginia Woolf?, which earned him a Tony Award for Best Actor in a Play. He continued acting on the Broadway stage in The Realistic Joneses, All My Sons, and The Minutes.

In film and television, he is known for his portrayal of Andrew Lockhart in seasons 3 and 4 of Showtime's Homeland, and pyramid-scheme con-artist Nick on the HBO comedy Divorce. In 2017, Letts starred in three critically acclaimed films: Azazel Jacobs' The Lovers, Greta Gerwig's Lady Bird, and Steven Spielberg's The Post. The latter two films were nominated for the Academy Award for Best Picture. Lady Bird earned Letts a nomination for the Screen Actors Guild Award for Outstanding Performance by a Cast in a Motion Picture. In 2019, he portrayed Henry Ford II in James Mangold's Ford v Ferrari and Mr. Dashwood in Gerwig's Little Women, the two also receiving Best Picture nominations.

Early life
Letts was born in Tulsa, Oklahoma, to author Billie Letts (née Gipson) and college professor and actor Dennis Letts. He has two brothers, Shawn, a musician, and Dana. Letts was raised in Durant, Oklahoma and graduated from Durant High School in the early 1980s. He moved to Dallas, where he waited tables and worked in telemarketing while beginning his acting career. He appeared in Jerry Flemmons' O Dammit!, which was part of a new playwrights' series sponsored by Southern Methodist University.

Letts moved to Chicago at the age of 20, working for the next 11 years at Steppenwolf Theatre Company and Famous Door. He is still an active member of Steppenwolf. He was a founding member of Bang Bang Spontaneous Theatre, whose members included Greg Kotis, Michael Shannon, Paul Dillon, and Amy Pietz. In 1991, Letts wrote the play Killer Joe. Two years later, the play premiered at the Next Lab Theater in Evanston, Illinois, followed by the 29th Street Rep in New York City. Since then, Killer Joe has been performed in a number of countries in 12 languages.

His mother, Billie Letts, has said of his work, "I try to be upbeat and funny. Everybody in Tracy's stories gets naked or dead." Letts's plays have depicted people struggling with moral and spiritual questions. He says he was inspired by the plays of Tennessee Williams and the novels of William Faulkner and Jim Thompson. Letts states that he considers sounds to be effective "storytelling tools" for theater.

Career

Theatre

Acting 
During the late 1980s through the late 2000s, Letts acted in many of the Steppenwolf Theatre Company's productions, starring in Steve Martin's Picasso at the Lapin Agile (1994).

In 2012, Letts gained attention for his Broadway debut performance in the revival of Edward Albee's Who's Afraid of Virginia Woolf? at the Booth Theatre. He received positive reviews and won the Tony Award for Best Actor in a Play.

In 2019, Letts appeared in the Broadway revival of Arthur Miller's All My Sons with Annette Bening at Roundabout Theatre Company's American Airlines Theatre. The show officially opened on April 22, 2019 and closed on June 23, 2019.

Writing 

Letts has written over ten plays. His most famous, August: Osage County, premiered at the Steppenwolf Theatre in Chicago on June 28, 2007. It had its Broadway debut at the Imperial Theatre on December 4, 2007; the production transferred to Broadway's Music Box Theatre on April 29, 2008. The Broadway show closed on June 28, 2009, after 648 performances and 18 previews. The show went on to receive seven Tony Award nominations, winning six, including Best Play. The play won Letts the Pulitzer Prize for Drama in 2008. Letts has also been a finalist for the Pulitzer drama prize for his plays Man from Nebraska and The Minutes; the Pulitzer committee described The Minutes as a "shocking drama set in a seemingly mundane city council meeting that acidly articulates a uniquely American toxicity that feels both historic and contemporary."

Television 
Early in his acting career, in the 1990s through the mid 2000s, Letts acted in TV shows including Prison Break, The District, Strong Medicine, Profiler, Judging Amy, The Drew Carey Show, Seinfeld, Early Edition, and Home Improvement.

In 2013–14, Letts joined the cast of Showtime's Homeland as US Senator Andrew Lockhart. He was nominated with the rest of the cast for the Screen Actors Guild Award for Best Ensemble.

In 2016, Letts joined HBO's marital comedy-drama Divorce.

In 2018, Letts was cast in the second season of USA Network's anthology crime drama series The Sinner, opposite Bill Pullman and Carrie Coon. He played Jack McKinney in HBO's 2022 series Winning Time: The Rise of the Lakers Dynasty.

Film

Acting 
Letts has starred in Adam McKay's 2015 ensemble piece, The Big Short, 2016's Wiener-Dog, Christine, and Elvis & Nixon; and James Schamus's film adaptation of the Philip Roth novel, Indignation, as well as the true-story crime thriller adaptation Imperium.

Letts then appeared in the 2017 films The Lovers, The Post, and Lady Bird.

In 2019, Letts portrayed Henry Ford II in James Mangold's sports drama film Ford v Ferrari, and played Mr. Dashwood in Little Women, a film adaptation of Louisa May Alcott's novel of the same name.

Writing 

Letts has written screenplays for three feature films based on his plays: Bug (directed by William Friedkin), Killer Joe (also directed by Friedkin); and August: Osage County (directed by John Wells). He also wrote the screenplay for the 2021 Netflix feature film The Woman in the Window, starring Amy Adams, based on the eponymous psychological thriller by A.J. Finn.

Personal life
Letts was once engaged to actress Sarah Paulson. He married actress Carrie Coon in September 2013. They have two children, born in 2018 and 2021. He has been sober since 1993.

Work as an author

Theatre

Screenwriter

Work as an actor

Theatre

Film

Television

Awards and nominations
Theatre awards

Film and television awards

References

External links
 
 
 
 
Write TV public television interview with Tracy Letts

1965 births
Living people
American male film actors
American male television actors
American male voice actors
American male screenwriters
20th-century American dramatists and playwrights
Drama Desk Award winners
People from Durant, Oklahoma
Male actors from Tulsa, Oklahoma
Pulitzer Prize for Drama winners
Tony Award winners
20th-century American male actors
21st-century American male actors
Writers from Tulsa, Oklahoma
21st-century American dramatists and playwrights
American male dramatists and playwrights
Steppenwolf Theatre Company players
Screenwriters from Oklahoma
20th-century American male writers
21st-century American male writers
Screenwriters from New York (state)